The Commutation Act of 1784, enacted by the British Parliament, reduced the tax on tea from 119% to 12.5%, effectively ending the smuggling trade. William Pitt the Younger, acting on the advice of Richard Twining of the Twinings Tea Company, introduced the Act to increase revenues through legitimate sales of tea by ending 100 years of punitive tea taxes which promoted smuggling.

The Act was created to stimulate trade in China for the British East India Company, which at the time was suffering from mounting debts. Indian opium was exchanged for tea in China which was then shipped to Britain for sale on the domestic market.

The Commutation Act improved trade relations between Britain and one of its primary tea suppliers, China.

Notes

History of tea
Smuggling
Great Britain Acts of Parliament 1784
History of taxation in the United Kingdom